Events from the year 1953 in Ireland.

Incumbents
 President: Seán T. O'Kelly
 Taoiseach: Éamon de Valera (FF)
 Tánaiste: Seán Lemass (FF)
 Minister for Finance: Seán MacEntee (FF)
 Chief Justice: Conor Maguire
 Dáil: 14th
 Seanad: 7th

Events
18 January – Sinn Féin decided to contest all 12 constituencies in the next Westminster elections in Northern Ireland.
15 March – Up to 10,000 civil servants marched on O'Connell Street in Dublin demanding a just wage.
16 March – Franklin Delano Roosevelt, Jr. asked the American Congress to support a United Ireland.
27 April – Maud Gonne MacBride died at her home in Dublin aged 88.
1 May – The BBC brought into service the first television transmitter in Ireland, at Glencairn (Belfast).
3 June – Five hundred unemployed men marched to Kildare Street demanding employment, not dole.
6 July – A thousand unemployed people sat on O'Connell Bridge for 15 minutes of protest.
2 August – Murlough Bay in the Antrim Glens was chosen as the future grave of Roger Casement. Taoiseach Éamon de Valera called for the return of his remains.
29 August – Kilmainham Gaol is to be preserved as a national monument.
30 August – A new synagogue was dedicated in Terenure in Dublin (designed by Wilfrid Cantwell).
1 September – The Great Northern Railway was sold to the governments of the Republic and Northern Ireland and managed by a joint board.
21 September – The Irish Ploughing Team left Dublin for the World Ploughing Championships in Canada.
20 October – Busáras opened in Dublin (designed by Michael Scott), CIÉ's country bus station and the first significant international style building in Ireland.
28 October – Three of Dáil Éireann's Independent TDs became members of Fianna Fáil.
30 October – Standish Vereker, 7th Viscount Gort, purchased Bunratty Castle to restore it.
17 November – The Great Blasket Island was depopulated.
18 December – The Censorship Board banned almost 100 publications on the grounds that they were indecent or obscene.

Arts and literature
 5 January – Samuel Beckett's play Waiting For Godot had its first public stage première in French as En attendant Godot in Paris. His novel The Unnamable was also published in French this year.
 5–26 April – The first An Tóstal festivals of national culture (devised by Seán Lemass) were held.
 8 August – Chester Beatty Library in Dublin opened to the public.
 Writer Brian O'Nolan was obliged to retire from his senior post in the Civil Service.

Sport

Association football

League of Ireland
Winners: Shelbourne

FAI Cup
Winners: Cork Athletic 2–2, 2–1 Evergreen United.

Golf
Irish Open is won by Eric Brown (Scotland).

Births
1 January – Maureen Beattie, Scottish actress.
6 January – Noel Dempsey, Fianna Fáil TD for Meath West and Minister for Transport.
27 January – Ger Loughnane, Clare hurler, manager of Galway hurling team.
28 January – Hugo Hamilton, writer.
4 February – James Stirling, Irish physicist and academic.
12 February – Des Smyth, golfer.
15 February – Tony Adams, Irish-American screenwriter and producer (d. 2005)
24 February – Eoin Ryan, Fianna Fáil TD, MEP for Dublin.
5 March – Brian Kerr, soccer manager, Republic of Ireland national side manager.
6 March – James Bannon, Senator, Fine Gael TD for Longford–Westmeath.
11 March
Derek Daly, motor racing driver.
Mary Harney, Tánaiste and leader of the Progressive Democrats.
Tom McCormack, Kilkenny hurler.
15 March – Richard Bruton, Deputy Leader of Fine Gael, TD for Dublin North-Central.
31 March – Breeda Moynihan-Cronin, Labour Party (Ireland) TD.
28 April – Paul Darragh, showjumper (died 2005).
16 May – Pierce Brosnan, actor.
17 May – Mary Flaherty, Fine Gael TD and junior minister.
30 May – Colm Meaney, actor.
31 May – Jerry Kiernan, long-distance runner
7 June – Kathleen Lynch, Labour Party TD for Cork North-Central.
12 June – John Moloney, Fianna Fáil TD for Laois–Offaly.
18 June – Neil O'Donoghue, American football placekicker.
7 July – Jim Glennon, Fianna Fáil politician and TD.
29 July – Frank McGuinness, playwright, translator and poet.
19 August – Tom Parlon, President of the IFA (1997–2001), Progressive Democrat TD representing Laois–Offaly.
1 September – Catherine Murphy, Independent TD.
18 September – Caoimhghín Ó Caoláin, bank official, Sinn Féin TD representing Cavan–Monaghan.
20 September – Joe Waters, soccer player.
23 September
Paudge Connolly, independent TD.
Dessie Ellis, Sinn Féin councillor in Dublin City Council, IRA prisoner, first person extradited to the United Kingdom under the 1987 Extradition Act.
26 September – Dolores Keane, singer and musician.
11 November – Jimmy Holmes, soccer player. 
26 November – Marian Harkin, Member of the European Parliament representing North-West, Independent Teachta Dála representing Sligo–Leitrim.
3 December – Nickey Brennan, Kilkenny hurler, President of the Gaelic Athletic Association.
Full date unknown
Patrick Deeley, poet.
Rita Kelly, poet.
Sheila O'Donnell, architect.

Deaths
11 February – Valentine McEntee, 1st Baron McEntee, Labour MP in the United Kingdom (born 1871).
22 February – John Caffrey, recipient of the Victoria Cross for gallantry in 1915 near La Brique, France (born 1891).
March – Louisa Watson Peat, writer and lecturer, died in the United States (born 1883)
13 April – Alice Milligan, nationalist poet and author (born 1865).
15 April – John Dignan, Roman Catholic Bishop of Clonfert (born 1880).
17 April – Tom Sharkey, boxer (born 1873).
3 June – Philip Graves, journalist and writer (born 1876).
14 July – Frank Fahy, Sinn Féin MP and later Fianna Fáil TD, member of 1st Dáil, Ceann Comhairle (born 1880).
23 July – Maude Delap, marine biologist (born 1866).
12 September – James Hamilton, 3rd Duke of Abercorn, Unionist politician and first Governor of Northern Ireland (born 1869).
17 October – Jack Rochford, Kilkenny hurler (born 1882).
30 October – John Counihan, farmer and salesmaster, Independent member of 1922 Seanad (born 1879).
1 November – Thomas F. O'Higgins, Fine Gael TD and Cabinet Minister (born 1890).
16 November – T. F. O'Rahilly, linguist and Irish language scholar (born 1883).
25 December – Patsy Donovan, Major League Baseball player and manager (born 1865).

References

 
1950s in Ireland
Ireland
Years of the 20th century in Ireland